Line 3 of the Beijing Subway is a rapid transit line under construction in Beijing. It is expected to open by the end of 2024. It will be colored rose red in system maps.

Description
It is fully underground. Due to unstable planning east of Dongfeng station, line 3 will only open between Dongsi Shitiao and Dongfeng. It will be opened by the end of 2024.

Stations (Phase I)

Rolling stock

Line 3 will initially use 4-car Type A rolling stock but platforms are designed to support expansion to 8-car trains.

History
Line 3's route has undergone substantial changes on the planners' drawing board. In the late 1990s, one draft of the subway plan showed Line 3 running from Xiaomeichang to Cuigezhuang. Half of that route was then folded into Line 6. In 2010 and 2011, Line 3 was mentioned in the development plans of other subway lines.

By January 2012, the Line 3's western section was slated to run east from Tiancun station in Haidian District under Fushi Road to Fuchengmen station.  On March 15, 2012, Line 3 was reportedly planned to run from Tiancun station to the eastern suburbs of Beijing in Gaoxinzhuang and Pingfang and to be built by 2020.

In June 2012, Beijing media reported the station plan of Line 3.

In January 2013, subway planners were examining whether to extend the Line 3 through the city centre given the concentration of historic relics in the area. In January 2014, it was reported that Line 3 will have 27 stations, with up to 16 transfer stations, including Ganjiakou station on Line 16 and Zhangzizhonglu on Line 5. The station plan for Ganjiakou had been released in 2013 by Beijing Municipal Commission of Urban Planning, which depicted the Line 3 platform built over that of Line 16. In February 2014, an official was quoted as saying that "Line 3 would run along Di'anmen Street, not Jingshan Front Street, with paralleling from Ping'anli to Nanluoguxiang." On April 19, 2016, the first phase of Line 3 started construction.

References 

Beijing Subway lines
Proposed public transport in China
Proposed buildings and structures in Beijing
Transport infrastructure under construction in China